Archive for Mathematical Logic is a peer-reviewed mathematics journal published by Springer Science+Business Media. It was established in 1950 and publishes articles on mathematical logic.

Abstracting and indexing
The journal is abstracted and indexed in:
 Mathematical Reviews
 Zentralblatt MATH
 Scopus
 SCImago

According to the Journal Citation Reports, the journal has a 2020 impact factor of 0.287.

References

External links

English-language journals
Logic journals
Mathematics journals
Mathematical logic
Publications established in 1950
Springer Science+Business Media academic journals
1950 establishments in West Germany